Luoxing Subdistrict is a subdistrict of Mawei District, Fuzhou, Fujian, China. The subdistrict had a population of 60,117 as of 2010.

History 
In February 1978, Mawei Town was established, and was upgraded to a subdistrict in August 1982.

On December 15, 1995, Mawei Subdistrict was renamed to Luoxing Subdistrict.

Administrative divisions 
Luoxing Subdistrict is divided into five residential communities and five administrative villages.

The subdistrict's five residential communities are Yanshan, Maxian, Luoxing, Xingang, and Peiying.

The subdistrict's five administrative villages are Shangqi, Qingzhou, Junzhu, Shuangfeng, and Luoxing.

Demographics 
The subdistrict had a population of 60,117 as of 2010, slightly down from its 60,446 as of 2000.

See also 
 List of township-level divisions of Fujian

References 

Township-level divisions of Fujian
Subdistricts of the People's Republic of China
Fuzhou